The 1917 South American Championship of Nations was the second edition of the continental tournament now known as the Copa América. It was held in Montevideo, Uruguay from 30 September to 14 October 1917. Hosts Uruguay retained the title after winning 1–0 over Argentina in the last match of the competition. Ángel Romano from Uruguay finished as the top scorer of the tournament with 4 goals.

Format

There was no qualifying for the tournament. The participating countries were Argentina, Brazil, Chile and Uruguay. All teams competed between each other in a single group. The one with the best position after the matches was the champion. Two points were awarded for a win, one for a draw, and zero for a defeat.

Squads

Venues
All the matches were played at Parque Pereira, a 40,000 seater multi-use stadium in Montevideo.

Final round
Each team played one match against each of the other teams. Two points were awarded for a win, one point for a draw and zero points for a defeat.

Result

Goal scorers

Own goals
  Luis García (for Argentina)

External links

 South American Championship 1917 at RSSSF

 
1917
1917
1
1917 in Uruguayan football
1917 in Brazilian football
1917 in Argentine football
1917 in Chilean sport
September 1917 sports events
October 1917 sports events
Sports competitions in Montevideo
1910s in Montevideo